Jarvis Walker is an Australian manufacturer of fishing tackle, primarily known for fishing reels and rods. It was founded in 1946 in Deepdene, Victoria by Jim Jarvis Walker. It was one of the earliest Australian manufacturers of fibreglass rods. Jarvis Walker is also known for its brands Jarvis Marine, Watersnake and Rovex.

See also

 List of sporting goods manufacturers
 List of companies of Australia

References

External links

Jarvis Walker Company Information

Fishing equipment manufacturers
1946 establishments in Australia
Manufacturing companies established in 1946
Marine engine manufacturers
Sporting goods manufacturers of Australia
Manufacturing companies based in Melbourne